This is a list of wild forests in the state of New York. Lands designated as "wild forest" in New York are managed by the New York State Department of Environmental Conservation as part of the Forest Preserve.

Management
Wild forests are intended to retain an essentially wild and natural character, however management facilitates a greater amount of recreational use than areas designated by the state as wilderness, which feature an increased sense of remoteness and solitude. Most are located within the boundaries of Adirondack Park or Catskill Park.

List of New York wild forests

See also 
 Albany Pine Bush
 Long Island Central Pine Barrens
 Rome Sand Plains

References

External links
NYS Department of Environmental Conservation:
Forest Preserve unit descriptions
Land units maps: Adirondack Park, Catskill Park

wild forests
wild forests
New York
wild forests
New York wild forests